Bedřich Moldan (born 15 August 1935, Prague, Czechoslovakia) is a Czech ecologist, publicist and politician.

Moldan is professor of environmental science, founder and director of the Charles University Environment Center. From 2001 to 2004 coordinating lead author of Millennium Ecosystem Assessment.

From  1990 to 1991, Bedřich Moldan was the first Minister of Environment of the Czech Republic, then part of Czechoslovakia. He is a founding member of the Civic Democratic Party. In 2004 he was elected to the Senate of the Czech Republic.

In 2010 he received the SCOPE-Zhongyu Environmental Award for lifetime achievement.

External links 
 Bedřich Moldan - Official website  
 Bedřich Moldan, interview BBC, August 29, 2001 

1935 births
Living people
Scientists from Prague
Civic Democratic Party (Czech Republic) Senators
Czech ecologists
Czech environmentalists
Environment ministers of the Czech Republic
Non-fiction environmental writers
Politicians from Prague
Civic Democratic Party (Czech Republic) Government ministers
Charles University alumni
Academic staff of Charles University
Czech geochemists